Charlie McConkey (born 1955) is a Democratic member of the Iowa House of Representatives, representing the 15th district.  McConkey was first elected in 2014 to replace retiring Republican Representative Mark Brandenburg.

McConkey endorsed former Maryland governor Martin O'Malley for the Democratic nomination in the 2016 presidential election.

Electoral history

References

External links

 Charlie McConkey at Iowa Legislature
 
 Biography at Ballotpedia
 Campaign Website
 Iowa House Democrats page

Democratic Party members of the Iowa House of Representatives
Living people
People from Council Bluffs, Iowa
1955 births
21st-century American politicians
Methodists from Iowa